The Black Dwarf was a political and cultural newspaper published between May 1968 and 1972 by a collective of socialists in the United Kingdom. It is often identified with Tariq Ali who edited and published the newspaper until 1970, when the editorial board split between Leninist and non-Leninist currents.

Black Dwarf took its name from the 19th-century radical paper of that name which was first published in 1817.

The editorial and production group included Ali, Clive Goodwin, Robin Fior, David Mercer, Mo Teitlebaum, Douglas Gill, Adrian Mitchell, Sheila Rowbotham, Bob Rowthorn, D. A. N. Jones, Sean Thompson, Neil Lyndon, Roger Tyrrell and Fred Halliday.

The Leninists, including Ali and other members of the International Marxist Group, went on to found the Red Mole.

The Black Dwarf newspaper published a special edition in autumn 1968 devoted entirely to the Bolivian Diaries of Che Guevara, in a translation first published by Ramparts in the United States. It included an introduction by Fidel Castro. This edition appeared to be in response to a version of the diaries put out by "some publishers in league with those who murdered Che".

John Hoyland and the musician John Lennon of The Beatles had an exchange of letters in the newspaper regarding Lennon's supposed bourgeois values. Hoyland in "An Open Letter to John Lennon", ostensibly a review of the Beatles recent eponymous white album, wrote that Lennon's song "Revolution" was no more revolutionary than Mrs Dale's Diary and that "In order to change the world we've got to understand what's wrong with the world then destroy it ruthlessly.... There's no such thing as a polite revolution." Lennon replied, writing: "...You're obviously on a destruction kick. I'll tell you what's wrong with the world – people, so do you want to destroy them? Ruthlessly? Until we change your/our heads – there's no chance...". Lennon's wrote in a postscript: "You smash it – I'll build around it".

See also
 List of underground newspapers of the 1960s counterculture

Notes

References

External links
John Hoyland, "Power to the People", The Guardian, 15 March 2008.

International Marxist Group
Publications established in 1968
Socialist newspapers published in the United Kingdom
Underground press